Johanna Jacoba Bleuland van Oordt (1865-1948) was a Dutch painter.

Biography
Oordt was born on 28 August 1865 in Katendrecht, Netherlands.  She studied at the Koninklijke Academie van Beeldende Kunsten (Royal Academy of Art, The Hague). Her teachers included . Her sister Adri Bleuland van Oordt was also an artist. Johanna and Adri exhibited regularly at the Haagse Kunstkring.

Oordt died on 15 December 1948, in Leidschendam.

In 2018 the  held an exhibition entitled Adriana and Johanna Bleuland van Oordt - Artistic sisters in a Voorburg country estate.

References

External links

1865 births
1948 deaths
Dutch women painters